Demba Malick (born on 20 April 1995), is a football player who represents the Central African Republic national football team.

References

1995 births
Living people
Central African Republic international footballers
Central African Republic footballers
Association football midfielders